Dainik Navajyoti is a Hindi language daily newspaper published in Rajasthan from Jaipur, Jodhpur, Ajmer, Udaipur & Kota. It was founded in 1936 by freedom fighter Captain Durgaprasad Chaudhary.

Editions

Dainik Navajyoti is printed from the following places:
 
 Ajmer      
 Jaipur 
 Jodhpur
 Kota, Rajasthan
 Nagaur
 Udaipur
 Gangapur City

References

Dainik Navajyoti

External links 
  

Mass media in Rajasthan
Hindi-language newspapers
Daily newspapers published in India
Publications established in 1936
1936 establishments in India
Ajmer